Fishing within the Bailiwick of Guernsey is common place. The bailiwick is made up of several islands in the Channel Islands, namely (Herm, Sark, Alderney and Guernsey).

Guernsey's territorial waters limit is 3 miles. For commercial fishing the bailiwick has a Fisheries Management Agreement enabling the licence and management of commercial fishing up to 12 nautical miles.

Fishing in Guernsey offers a large range of species available to catch which will involve many different styles of fishing to adopt and learn to become successful.

Most common fish caught off the bailiwick shores are:
Bass
Bream
Garfish (longnose)
Mackerel
Pollack
Wrasse

Many more fish are in abundance around the shores.

Guernsey records 
 Fishing Guernsey-records

Locations 
Caught record fish locations

Guernsey

St Peter Port Breakwater - Location of eight bailiwick records (angler fish, Couch's sea bream, lesser spotted dogfish, flounder, smooth hound, tadpole fish, whiting and ballan wrasse). As the records show, the St Peter Port breakwater is good fishing for many species. Located just passed Castle Cornet in the town of St Peter Port. The breakwater is a light house on the end of a pier. It offers easy access and safe fishing although it can be very busy due its advantages.

Pembroke - L'Ancresse - Chouet All three locations are in very close proximity to each other and boast five bailiwick records (bass, cod, red gurnard, tub gurnard and pouting). Located on the north west coast of Guernsey, The Lancresse area offers sandy beaches with easy access for rock or beach fishing.

White Rock - QEII Marina - Albert Pier - Crown Pier - Salerie (The White Rock no longer exists due to land reclamation.) These sites held four records (eel common, sea trout, garfish, mackrel and thin lipped mullet). All four locations are situated in St Peter Port town. They are the piers and that separate the three marina's, Albert, Crown and QEII, all four of which are also car park areas.

Alderney Breakwater Location of three bailiwick records (starry smooth hound, three bearded rockling, marbled electric ray).

References

External links
 Tackle Direct 2 U - Local Guernsey fishing tackle shop

Guernsey
Sport in Guernsey
Economy of Guernsey
Water in Guernsey
Guernsey